Ali Yavuz Kol (born 29 January 2001) is a Turkish professional footballer who plays as a forward for 24 Erzincanspor on loan from Adana Demirspor.

Club career
Kol is a youth product for Galatasaray, and joined Tarsus İdman Yurdu on loan for the 2019–20 season. Kol made his professional debut with Galatasaray in a 1-1 Süper Lig tie with Kayserispor on 23 November 2020.

Denizlispor (loan)
On 27 January 2021, Denizlispor one of the Süper Lig teams, tied Ali Yavuz Kol, who plays for Galatasaray, to his colors until the end of the 2020-21 season.

Ankara Keçiörengücü (loan)
On 27 August 2021, Galatasaray announced that the 20-year-old football player was loaned to Ankara Keçiörengücü, one of the TFF First League teams, until the end of the season.

Adana Demirspor
On 14 July 2022, it was announced that he signed a 2+2 year contract with Adana Demirspor.

References

External links
 
 

2001 births
Living people
Sportspeople from Antalya
Turkish footballers
Turkey youth international footballers
Galatasaray S.K. footballers
Tarsus Idman Yurdu footballers
Denizlispor footballers
Ankara Keçiörengücü S.K. footballers
Adana Demirspor footballers
24 Erzincanspor footballers
Süper Lig players
TFF First League players
TFF Second League players
Association football forwards